Oost, Dutch for "east", may refer to:

 Jason Oost, Dutch football player
 Oost-Maarland, a village in the Dutch province of Limburg
 Oost, Limburg, a hamlet in Oost-Maarland
 Oost, North Holland, a hamlet in the Dutch municipality of Texel
 Oost, Rijnmond, a subregion of the Dutch region of Rijnmond
 Oost, Suriname, a town in the Para District of Suriname
 Oost, a borough of Amsterdam, Netherlands
 Oost (river), a river in Hanover, Germany